Vern Gosdin was an American country music artist. His discography consists of 14 studio albums and 41 singles. Of his singles, 41 charted on the U.S. Billboard Hot Country Songs charts between 1976 and 1993.

Studio albums

Compilation albums

Singles

Music videos

See also
The Hillmen

Notes
A^ There Is a Season also peaked at number 4 on the RPM Country Albums chart in Canada.
B^ If Jesus Comes Tomorrow (What Then) was re-released on June 20, 1995 by Key Brothers Entertainment as The Gospel Album.

References

Country music discographies
Discographies of American artists